Rahuri  taluka, is a taluka in the Shrirampur subdivision of the Ahmednagar district in Maharashtra, India.

Area by land use

Rivers
The Mula River flows through Rahuri.

Villages
For a list of villages, see villages in Rahuri taluka.

There are approximately 96 villages in Rahuri taluka.

MALHARWADI is a village in Rahuri Taluka in Ahmednagar District of Maharashtra, India. It belongs to Nashik Division . It is located 38 km towards North from District headquarters Ahmednagar. 10 km from Rahuri Khurd. 218 km from State capital Mumbai

Malharwadi Pin code is 413705 and postal head office is Rahuri Town .

Momin Akhada ( 3 km ), Digras ( 5 km ), Baragaon Nandur ( 5 km ), Birobanagar ( 6 km ), Rahuri Khurd ( 6 km ) are the nearby Villages to Malharwadi. Malharwadi is surrounded by Shrirampur Taluka towards North, Ahmednagar Taluka towards South, Rahata Taluka towards North, Nagar Taluka towards South

Ghorpadwadi is a village in Rahuri Taluka in Ahmednagar District of Maharashtra, India. It is in the region of Khandesh and Northern Maharashtra and is a part of the Nashik Division. It is located 39 km north of the district headquarters of Ahmednagar, 11 km from Rahuri Khurd and 217 km from Mumbai. Its exports include vegetables, such as onions and brinjal. Approximately 80% of the land is dedicated to agricultural purposes. Its major associating active group is |jai bajrang yuva pratisthan. |

Ghorpadwadi's Pin code is 413705 and the postal head office is at Rahuri town.

Nearby villages include Momin Akhada (3 km), Baragaon Nandur (4 km), Digras (6 km), Chinchvihire (7 km), Birobanagar (7 km), Vambori (19.5 km). Ghorpadwadi is surrounded by Shrirampur Taluka to the North, Ahmednagar Taluka and Nagar Taluka to the South and Rahata Taluka to the East.

Rahuri, Shrirampur, Ahmednagar, Sangamner, Belapur are nearby cities to Ghorpadwadi.

Ghorpadwadi 2011 Census Details 
Ghorpadwadi's local language is Marathi. Its total population is 1509, and it has 259 houses. 48.2% of the population is female. The village's literacy rate is 63%, and the female literacy rate is 25.5%.

Vambori
Places to visit in Vambori are Dongargan, Bhairavji temple, gorakhksyanath temple, ostwal farmhouse.

Politics in Ghorpadwadi 
The area's major political parties are BJP, NCP and SHS.

Polling Stations and Booths near Ghorpadwadi 

 Malewadi Dlukrewadi Z.p. School East West Building West Side Room No. 2
 Ghatshiras Z.p. School East West Building West Side Room No. 1
 Mokal Ohal Z.p. School East West Building West Side Room No. 2
 Momin Akhada Z.p. School East West Building West Side Room No. 1
 Vambori Mahesh Munot Vidyalaya South North (west Side Old Building ) South Side Room No. 3

Travel to Ghorpadwadi

By Road 
Rahuri is the nearest town to Ghorpadwadi, 8 km (5 miles) away.

By Rail 
Ghorpadwadi is also accessible by rail from Rahuri.  The remaining 8 km (5 miles) to Ghorpadwadi must be traveled by road.  Aurangabad, 103 km (64 miles) from Ghorpadwadi, is another rail link.

Colleges near Ghorpadwadi

Schools in Ghorpadwadi 
Z.p.p.school Ghorpadwadi Address : ghorpadwadi , rahuri , ahmadnagar , Maharashtra . PIN- 413705 , Post - Rahuri Town

Population
The table below shows the population of the taluka by sex. Data is taken from the 2001 census.

Rainfall
The table below lists rainfall from 1981 to 2004.

Universities and colleges
 Mahatma Phule Krishi Vidyapeeth

See also
 Talukas in Ahmednagar district
 Villages in Rahuri taluka

References

Cities and towns in Ahmednagar district
Talukas in Ahmednagar district
Talukas in Maharashtra